This is a list of members of the Tasmanian Legislative Council between 1993 and 1999. Terms of the Legislative Council did not coincide with Legislative Assembly elections, and members served six year terms, with a number of members facing election each year.

During this period, legislation was passed to reduce the Council from 19 to 15 seats. It was the most major change in the Council's makeup since 1870. 15 of the members were appointed to new seats in 1999.

Elections

Members

Transition arrangements

Notes
  In April 1995, Charles Batt, the Labor member for Derwent, retired. Labor candidate Michael Aird won the resulting by-election on 27 May 1995.
  On 6 July 1998, Ross Ginn, the member for Newdegate, resigned due to ill health. Labor candidate John White won the resulting by-election on 19 September 1998.

Sources
 Parliament of Tasmania (2006). The Parliament of Tasmania from 1856

Members of Tasmanian parliaments by term
20th-century Australian politicians